Patong refers to the beach and town on Phuket's west coast. It is the main tourist resort on the island of Phuket, and is the centre of Phuket's nightlife and shopping. The beach became popular with Western tourists, especially Europeans, in the late-1980s. It has numerous hotels and the area has expanded into a tourist place.

History

Patong Beach is known for its nightlife and 2850-metre (1.77 mile) beach that runs the entire length of Patong's west side. Nightlife is centered in two main areas, Bangla Road and the "Paradise Complex", with Bangla Road being predominantly straight and Paradise Complex gay. Both are lined with many bars, discotheques, and go go bars. Prostitution in Thailand is illegal, but tolerated, as is the case in Patong. 

On 26 December 2004, Patong Beach along with many other areas along the west coast of Phuket and Thailand were struck by a tsunami caused by the 2004 Indian Ocean earthquake. The wave caused a great deal of destruction to the waterfront of the beach and immediately inland and only one woman was killed in a basement seafront grocery store. Patong was one of the worst affected areas of Phuket, although the destruction was not as bad as nearby Khao Lak. Patong has largely recovered since the tsunami.

Environment
 the waters off Patong Beach exceeded Thai Pollution Control Department standards for fecal coliform bacteria (FCB) and enterococci bacteria. To avoid paying the municipal wastewater treatment fee of five baht per cubic meter, many households discharge their wastewater untreated into canals and the sea. Patong also has limited capacity to treat wastewater. The municipal wastewater treatment plant is nearing its capacity of 28,000 m3 a day. An upgrade be operational in 2018 which will increase capacity by an extra 9,000 m3 per day.

Nightlife 
Bang-la is considered as the most popular walking street in Phuket. Along the street is full of beer bars and go-go bars, which makes tourists stay there longer or in a whole night.

Gallery

References

External links

Patong videos
Patong Beach video guide

Populated places in Phuket province
Beaches of Phuket Province
Red-light districts in Thailand